Sumitomo Forestry is a Japanese logging and processing company. The company is also engaged in the construction of houses made of wooden materials. Included in the Sumitomo Group keiretsu.

At present, the company controls 40,500 hectares of forest in Japan. In addition to logging, the company produces building and finishing materials made of wood, as well as metal and ceramic building materials. Sumitomo Forestry is also an active player in the market for wooden house construction in Japan, the USA, China, the Republic of Korea and others. In this segment in Japan, the company is a leader. The company also owns Texas-based homebuilder Gehan Homes and Charlotte-based developer Crescent Communities in the USA.

It is the developer of the proposed wooden skyscraper W350 Project.

History 
Sumitomo began harvesting its own timber in 1691 to meet the needs of the copper smelter.

In 1894, the company began to plant artificial forests for their subsequent harvesting.

The logging business was spun off into a separate department in 1898.

During the Second World War (since 1942), the company began to harvest wood in Indonesia on the islands of Sumatra, Borneo, Java.

In 1948, the Sumitomo zaibatsu was effectively liquidated and the forestry business was spun off into a separate entity. Sumitomo Forestry itself was formed in 1955 by merging Toho Norin Co., Ltd. and Shikoku Ringyo Co., Ltd.

In 1964, the company starts the business of building real estate from timber.

In 1970, a subsidiary, P.T., was established in Indonesia. Kutai Timber Indonesia. The production of plywood is also organized here.

In 1986, a subsidiary company, Nelson Pine Industries Ltd., was created in New Zealand, where the production of fiberboard was organized.

In 1990, the company is listed on the Tokyo Stock Exchange.

In 1991, in Indonesia, the company switches to a reforestation scheme.

In 1993, Sumitomo Forestry established the INOS Group to strengthen its position in the timber housing market.

In 2001, as a result of the merger of Sumitomo Forestry Crex Co., Ltd., Sumirin Holz Co., Ltd., Sumirin Plywood Industries, Ltd. and Fuji Incombustible Building Materials Industry Co., Ltd. Sumitomo Forestry Crest Co., Ltd. is established.

In 2003, the company enters the US wooden housing market (Seattle). Entered the Chinese market in 2004.

In 2006, the company merged with Ataka Kenzai Co., Ltd. In the same year, it enters the commercial real estate market of the Republic of Korea.

See also 
 Sumitomo Group

References

External links 
 

 
1691 establishments in Japan
Companies established in 1691